Kottiyoor Wildlife Sanctuary is Wildlife Sanctuary located in Kannur district of Kerala, India. Situated near to other sanctuaries in Kerala and Karnataka, the Kottiyoor Wildlife Sanctuary is rich in biodiversity and rich flora and fauna.

History
As per government order numbers G.O(MS)No.17/2011/F&WL, Kottiyoor reserve forest, a part of Nilgiri Biosphere Reserve was declared as Kottiyoor Wildlife Sanctuary on 1 March 2011.

Description
Kottiyoor Wildlife Sanctuary is a wildlife sanctuary located in Kottiyoor village in Kannur district of Kerala. This wildlife sanctuary is located close to the Aralam Wildlife Sanctuary and the Wayanad Wildlife Sanctuary in Kerala and Brahmagiri Wildlife Sanctuary in Karnataka. Forests in the sanctuary include evergreen forests, semi-evergreen forests, deciduous forests and grasslands. The Bavali River, a tributary of Valapattanam River flows through the boundaries of the sanctuary.

Flora and fauna
There are more than 41 species of mammals recorded in the sanctuary including Asian elephant, Tiger, Leopard Gaur, Sambar deer, Barking deer, Travancore flying squirrel, Lion-tailed macaque, Nilgiri langur, and Malabar slender loris. The 179 bird species recorded here includes Broad-tailed grassbird, Nilgiri wood pigeon, Blue-winged parakeet, Malabar grey hornbill, Grey-headed bulbul, Wayanad laughingthrush, Rufous babbler, White-bellied blue flycatcher, White-bellied treepie and Nilgiri pipit. The Kottiyoor Wildlife Sanctuary is also the home to 36 species of reptiles, 23 species of amphibians, 29 species of fish, 216 species of butterflies and 55 species of odonates. The Cnemaspis kottiyoorensis, endemic to Kerala,  is named after its locality, Kottiyoor.

References

Wildlife sanctuaries in Kerala
Wildlife sanctuaries of the Western Ghats
Protected areas of Kerala
2011 establishments in Kerala
Protected areas established in 2011